The 1991 Special Honours in New Zealand was a Special Honours Lists, dated 14 November 1991, recognising service by New Zealand military personnel in the Persian Gulf region and members of New Zealand expeditions to the Antarctic.

Order of the British Empire

Member (MBE)
Additional, military division
 Warrant Officer Patrick Grant McKay – Royal New Zealand Air Force. In recognition of service within the operations in the Persian Gulf region.

British Empire Medal (BEM)
Military division
 Flight Sergeant Mark MacDonald Harwood – Royal New Zealand Air Force. In recognition of service within the operations in the Persian Gulf region.
 Sergeant Robert Mataroa – Royal New Zealand Air Force. In recognition of service within the operations in the Persian Gulf region.

Air Force Cross (AFC)
 Wing Commander Robert Gordon Henderson – Royal New Zealand Air Force. In recognition of service within the operations in the Persian Gulf region.

Air Force Medal (AFM)
 Master Air Loadmaster Grant Travis Harold Mindon Roberts – Royal New Zealand Air Force. In recognition of service within the operations in the Persian Gulf region.

Polar Medal
With clasp "Antarctic 1959–1990"
 Graeme Geoffrey Claridge – of Wellington. For valuable services as a member of New Zealand expeditions to Antarctica in recent years.
With clasp "Antarctic 1964–1990"
 Dr Iain Bruce Campbell – of Nelson. For valuable services as a member of New Zealand expeditions to Antarctica in recent years.
With clasp "Antarctic 1981–1990"
 Dr John Alan MacDonald – of Auckland. For valuable services as a member of New Zealand expeditions to Antarctica in recent years.

References

Special honours
Special honours